Gerrit van der Linde (25 August 1927 – 14 October 2022) was a Dutch jurist. He was a justice of the Supreme Court of the Netherlands from 1981 to 1997.

Van der Linde died on 14 October 2022, at the age of 95.

References

1927 births
2022 deaths
Dutch jurists
Supreme Court of the Netherlands justices
People from Steenwijkerland